Craig Murray may refer to:

Craig Murray, British human rights activist and former diplomat
Craig Murray (footballer), Scottish footballer
Craig Murray (ice hockey) in 1998 NHL Entry Draft
Craig Murray (racing driver) in 2001 British Formula Three season